Cisthene juanita is a moth of the family Erebidae. It was described by William Barnes and Foster Hendrickson Benjamin in 1925 and is found in the United States in southern Arizona.

References

Cisthenina
Moths described in 1925